The Isabella Psalter (BSB Cod.gall. 16), also called the Psalter of Queen Isabella or the Psalter of Isabella of England, is a 14th-century volume containing the Book of Psalms, named for Isabella of France, who is herself depicted in it; it was likely a gift upon her betrothal or marriage. The illuminated manuscript is also notable for its bestiary.

Origin and history of the manuscript
The psalter was produced ca. 1303–1308. Like its "closest relation," the Tickhill Psalter, it shows a French influence and is similar in content and style to the Queen Mary Psalter and the Ormesby Psalter. Like the Queen Mary and Tickhill psalters, and like the Egerton Gospel and the Holkham Picture Bible, some of its captions and illustrations can be traced to the 12th-century Historia scholastica; all these 14th-century manuscripts may have "a thirteenth-century Parisian antecedent, reflected in the Tours Genesis window" (in reference to a window in the clerestory of the Tours Cathedral). It is currently held in the Bavarian State Library, Munich.

According to Donald Drew Egbert, the illuminators belong to the same group that illuminated the Tickhill Psalter. Art historian Ellen Beer, however, states that while there are similarities, Egbert is too quick to identify the illuminators (whom he connects to four other manuscripts as well). According to Beer, two of the illuminators responsible for the Psalter of St. Louis can be recognized in the Isabella Psalter.

Description
The psalter measures  and consists of 131 parchment pages. The first section is a calendar, with two illuminations per page, followed by a section with illuminations of scenes from the Old Testament and a complete bestiary, which (as in the Queen Mary Psalter) are executed as marginalia.

References
Notes

Bibliography

External links
Isabella Psalter at the Bavarian State Library

14th-century illuminated manuscripts
Illuminated psalters
Bestiaries